Kattavia (also  or ) is a small village located on the southernmost tip of the island of Rhodes. It is located within the municipal unit of South Rhodes (Nótia Ródos - Νότια Ρόδος) and was at the epicentre of the 2008 Dodecanese earthquake.

Overview
Kattavia is a part of the Municipality of Southern Rhodes which is one of 10 municipalities on Rhodes.  The municipality seat is Gennadi, which is located about 14 km north of Kattavia.

Kattavia village square or platia is situated over a creek which is dry for most of the year.  The village currently has five full-service cafes and two general stores.

Kattavia is generally considered to be a traditional village which hasn't been affected much by overdevelopment.  The Municipality of Southern Rhodes requires all new construction to adhere to strict traditional building designs when located within the village limits.

In recent years, the village has become a destination due to its proximity to Prasonisi, a popular windsurfing beach.

History 
When the Knights Hospitaller ruled Rhodes, Kattavia was turned into a fortified village where the population could find refuge when attacked by forces of the Ottoman Empire.

Historical Sites 
The church of Agia Paraskevi,  the patron saint of the village (19th century), and the church of Panagia Katholiki a 10th-century church located within the villages cemetery.

On the way to Prasonisi on the right hand side, the archaeological site of “Vroulia” is found. It is an ancient coastal settlement that many to believe to the predessecor to modern day Kattavia known for its terracotta vessels called “vessels of Vroulia”. Other historical sites include:

 Saint George (17th century)
 Saint Minas (19th century)
 Prophet Elias (19th century)
 Apostle Paul (20th century)
 Saint Panteleimonas (20th century)
 Saint Mark (Italian Catholic church  (20th century) reopened (August, 2017) as a Greek Orthodox Church)

Demographics 
Kattavia's  current population is 250 people, but its registered population is around 600.  In the summer months the population of Kattavia swells to over 700, due to the Greek Diaspora returning home from countries such as the United States and Australia.

Festivals 
The village's patron saint is Aghia Paraskevi. Her feast day is July 26, when the village throws a 3-day festival held within the village square.  Festivals throughout the year include:
 Saint Paraskevi on July 26. The festival takes place the night before and ends the next evening.
 Saint Panteleimonas on July 27. The festival takes place the night before and ends the next evening
 Dormition of the Virgin Mary on August 15.

Notes

References
 Fürst, Florian (2001) Rhodes: An Up-to-date Travel Guide Nelles, Munich, p. 59, 
 Dubin, Marc Stephen (2005) "Kattaviá and Prassoníssi" The Dodecanese and the East Aegean islands: Includes Rhodes, Kos, Sames and Lesvos Rough Guides, London, pp. 140–142 
 Riak, Patricia (2005) Concealing and Revealing. The Sousta as Honorable Dance on the Island of Rhodes. Ph.D. Thesis, School of Politics and Anthropology, La Trobe University, Victoria, Australia. This is a postgraduate thesis in Social Anthropology reconstructing the traditional wedding in the village of Kattavia during the inter-war period 1925-1940. A copy of the thesis is housed at the Municipal Library of Rhodes in the Old Medieval Town.

External links

South Rhodes website

Populated places in Rhodes